Hydrelia flammulata is a moth in the family Geometridae first described by Max Bastelberger in 1911. It is found in China.

References

Moths described in 1911
Asthenini
Moths of Asia